Dudleyville may refer to:

Dudleyville, Alabama, United States
Dudleyville, Arizona, United States
Dudleyville, Illinois, United States
Dudleyville, Michigan, United States